The year 1692 in music involved some significant events.

Events
July 7 – Giuseppe Felice Tosi becomes second organist at San Petronio, Bologna.
Seven-year-old George Frideric Handel visits the court of Saxony at Weissenfels. Duke Johann Adolf is so impressed at his playing of the organ that he advises his father to let him study music under Friedrich Wilhelm Zachau.

Publications
John Lenton and Thomas Tollett – A Consort of Musick of Three Parts
Jacques Guislain Pamart – Messe et mottets à une, deux et 5 voix, instruments et ripienes, Op. 1
John Playford – The Banquet of Musick
Johannes Schenk – Il giardino armonico, Op.3

Classical music
Heinrich Ignaz Franz Biber – Requiem in F Minor
Dietrich Buxtehude
Was mich auf dieser Welt betrübt, BuxWV 105
Trio Sonata in D major, BuxWV 267
Marc-Antoine Charpentier  
Magnificat à 4 voix avec instruments, H.79
Verbum caro, panum verbum, H.267
Canticum de Sancto Xaverio reformatum, H.355a
Johann Kuhnau – Neuer Clavier-Übung, anderer Theil
Marin Marais – Pièces en trio
Rupert Ignaz Mayr – Pythagorische Schmids-Fuencklein
Henry Purcell  
Ode to St. Cecilia, Z. 328
If Music be the Food of Love, Z.379
Stript of Their Green Our Groves Appear, Z.444
Aureng-Zebe, Z.573
Oedipus, Z.583 (inc. Musick for a While)
The Libertine, Z.600
Ludovico Roncalli – Capricci armonici sopra la chitarra spagnola
Giuseppe Torelli – Sinfonie a 3 e Concerti a 4, Op.5
Antonio Veracini – Trio Sonatas, Op.1

Opera
Cataldo Amodei – La sirena consolata (lost)
Carlo Agostino Badia – La ninfa Apollo
Antonio Perti – Furio Camillo
Henry Purcell – The Fairy Queen (masque)

Births
January 6 – Rynoldus Popma van Oevering, composer
January 13 – Gunnila Grubb composer (died 1729)
April 8 – Giuseppe Tartini, violinist and composer (died 1770)
May 28 – Geminiano Giacomelli, opera composer (died 1740)
November 2 – Unico Wilhelm van Wassenaer, composer (died 1766)
November 21 – Carlo Innocenzo Frugoni, librettist (died 1768)

Deaths
February 24 – Antimo Liberati, Italian music theorist, composer, and contralto singer (b. 1617)
July 10 – Heinrich Bach, German organist (born 1615)
October 12 – Giovanni Battista Vitali, Italian composer of sonatas (born c.1644)
November 14 – Christoph Bernhard, German composer (born 1628)
November 19 – Thomas Shadwell, librettist (born c.1642)
date unknown – John Reading, organist and composer (born c.1645) 

 
17th century in music
Music by year